Ilari Metsola (born August 16, 1992) is a Finnish ice hockey defenceman. He is currently playing with Peliitat Heinola in the Finnish Mestis.

Metsola made his Liiga debut playing with HIFK during the 2012–13 Liiga season.

References

External links

1992 births
Living people
Ice hockey people from Helsinki
Finnish ice hockey defencemen
HIFK (ice hockey) players
Lahti Pelicans players